Iryna Serhiivna Podolska (born 14 March 1995) is a Ukrainian footballer who plays as a defender for Women's League club Vorskla Poltava and the Ukraine women's national team.

References

1995 births
Living people
Women's association football defenders
Ukrainian women's footballers
Ukraine women's international footballers
WFC Zhytlobud-2 Kharkiv players